The Annobón scops owl (Otus feae) is an owl endemic to the Equatorial Guinea island of Annobón. The current population is estimated to be around 50-249 individuals, with the population declining due to habitat alteration and destruction. When describing the species in 1903, Tommaso Salvadori noted that the birds were abundant in wooded areas at altitudes of 400–500 metres on the island. Few sightings of the bird have been reported since then.

Little data is known about the Annobón scops owl. It is considered to have similar characteristics to the African scops owl, apart from a smaller wing length (about 120–135 mm).

References

Annobón scops owl
Endemic birds of Annobón
Critically endangered fauna of Africa
Annobón scops owl